WGBB (1240 AM) is a radio station licensed to Freeport, New York and serving Nassau County, New York. It is Long Island's oldest radio station, founded in 1924. It broadcasts the Chinese–language "Chinese Radio Network" and various English and Spanish language religious and ethnic brokered programming. The studio is located in Merrick, New York and its transmitter is located in Freeport, former location of the studio.

History

The Carman years (1923–1954)
WGBB first signed-on the air December 13, 1923, as a 150-watt share-time outlet. The call letters were twisted into the slogan "Where Good Broadcasting Begins," but in actuality were sequentially assigned by the Commerce Department from an alphabetical list. Harry H. Carman, ham station operator 2EL, was creator and owner until his death in 1954. Carman was seriously injured in an auto accident just before Christmas 1953 and perished the following July.

Initially WGBB transmitted on several frequencies:

 1923: 1230 kHz (150 watts)  
 1927: 1220 kHz (400 watts) sharing with WAAT, Jersey City, New Jersey; and WSOM, New York City
 and by November 1928: 1210 kHz (100 watts) and now sharing with several suburban stations including WBRB, Red Bank, New Jersey; WFAS, White Plains, New York; and WGNY, Newburgh, New York.

Share-time agreements were common in radio's early days because there were more stations than frequencies. WGNY dropped out in 1939 by moving to 1220. Then as part of the March 29, 1941, federal rearranging and expansion of the entire AM band, WGBB was shifted to 1240. By 1942 the frequency share was condensed when WBRB went out of business. On March 22, 1943, WFAS relocated to 1230 and WGBB became the sole occupant of 1240 ending nineteen years of share-time operation.

In 1931 "The Voice of the Sunrise Trail" was moved from the Carman Bedell Street Freeport home to the Freeport Post Office Building at 64 S. Grove Street; the post office was in the process of relocating to its current building on Merrick Road. In 1937 the studios were relocated to 44 S. Grove Street. The transmitter remained at 217 Bedell Street; situated in Carman's garage. In 1947 WGBB's long-wire antenna, strung between utility poles in Carman's backyard was replaced by a gleaming self-supporting 285-foot vertical antenna. This improvement probably was in response to WHNY, a new FM sister station to WHLI in nearby Hempstead, WGBB's first local competitor. Carman's original tower was replaced with the current structure in the early 1980s.

Post-Carman
After Carman's death, WGBB's long-time sales manager Murray Evans took the wheel until the station was sold for $95,000 ($800,000 in 2012 dollars) to a group of Long Island businessmen. "Long Island's First Station, Inc." named John Whitmore station manager and he rapidly restructured programming into an up-to-date presentation playing current music. Despite the makeover WGBB fell into receivership.

On August 6, 1956, Edward J. Fitzgerald, owner of WGSM in Huntington, New York took control. The sale approved by the Federal Communications Commission and a bankruptcy court judge; the price was assumption of WGBB's debt. And the FCC waived its duopoly rule which prohibited ownership of overlapping signals saying this is a way to be sure creditors would be paid. Fitzgerald guided the station's music policy back to standards away from current hits and especially doo-wop which was being played on the popular Night Train evening music show hosted by Lee Donahue and then Alan Fredericks. Soon after taking over Fitzgerald invested in a Collins 300G transmitter boosting WGBB's power to 250 watts. In 1956 WGBB was the only remaining 100-watt station in the New York area and one of a just handful in the entire country. It was said that Carman had asked the FCC not to grant a power increase because of the substantial investment. It was also rumored that Carman rejected an FCC proposal to outfit WGBB with a new frequency and a power increase to 50,000 watts to fill the need for another major coastal signal. Staffers, disheartened by these unusual choices, knew that Carman and program director Ada Cheesman did not have the competence or assets to accomplish such a transformation.

Under Fitzgerald's direction WGBB began to attract big-league national sponsors because sale of commercial announcements on WGBB/WGSM were made in combination, accounting for a revenue surge. Fitzgerald connected his stations with broadcast telephone lines establishing "The Long Island Network," which offered hourly news, sports, a fishing report, weekend public affairs programs, even a few music shows. The news originated at WGBB which had ample space for a newsroom. In 1962, under the direction of chief engineer Richard Carlsen, WGBB set up an RCA BTA 1 MX transmitter increasing day-time power to 1,000 watts but remaining 250 watts at night. The power increase was possible because of Freeport's Kahn Laboratories and their groundbreaking signal tweaking identified on the air as "experimental station KE2XXS." A Kahn black-box cut the WGBB bandwidth in half and sent out a compatible single sideband signal. (AM transmits with twin signals on each side of the carrier wave.) This venture proved that adjacent local stations could operate with more power and not cause interference to each other clearing the way for WGBB's 1,000-watt daytime signal.

Some announcers, personalities, and news reporters from the fifties and sixties with their future destinations: Nick Charles ('60 PD, UPI), Mike Sands, Edward Brown (WNEW), Bob Beneke, Bill Jaker (WSKG), Bill O'Toole, Cal Miller, Clem Cooper, Tony James, John Bohannon (CBS Radio), Don Crane, Jim Powers, Lee Carle (WSTA), Roy Whitfield (WPIX), Jon Ester (WHO-TV), Phil Allen (WPIX-FM), Robert Scott, Ray Adell, Bruce Herbert, Joe Roberts, Hank Howard, Norma Jenkins (switchboard), Dick London (WWRL), Al D'Amico (WPIX-FM), Steve Marko, Peter Strauss, Andy Rage (production/copy), Burt Stalper, Ben Thumb, Chet Adams, John Allen (WCBS-FM as Al Meredith), Bob Logan (WRHU), Ken Lamb (ABC-TV), Phil Doran (chairman BBDO as Phil Dusenberry), John Frogge (ND '31-'56 "News of Nassau"), Bill Goddard (ND '56-'62), Christopher Glenn (CBS), John Mead (WNEW), John Anthony Zee, Jim McKay (WCWP as James F. McConnochie), Andy Anderson, Harry Hart, and Andy Benedict. Zee was on the air November 22, 1963, and reported the assassination of President John F. Kennedy and made the announcement that Kennedy was dead. Zee went to Hollywood and an acting career appearing in many movies and network TV shows.

On May 12, 1965, WGBB was sold for $452,000 ($3.5 million in 2018 dollars) to Susquehanna, a group broadcaster based in York, Pennsylvania. Susquehanna built new studios in a building just a few steps from the Merrick Long Island Railroad station ending twenty-eight years at the 44 S. Grove Street loft. A World War Two vintage Gates mixing board from the main control room was salvaged and continued service in the new WGBB production studio. WGBB morphed into a pop music outlet with a strong local news presence enjoying what many have said were its best years. Names from the Susquehanna era include: William Musser (General Manager), Bob Lawrence (Program Director and play-by-play for the New York Islanders and New York Nets), Dave Vieser, Jim Quinn (for years as Dennis Quinn, WPIX-FM, WQCD, NYC), Roy Reynolds, Mike McKay, John Gardener, Gary McFarlane, John Commins, "Bullet" Bob Ottone, Frank Brinka, Gil David, Joe Dougherty (creative services, writer-producer of Thirtysomething, Judging Amy and Pretty Little Liars), Don Rosen, Charlie Day (WCBS-FM and WHN NYC and the syndicated Weekly Country Music Countdown as Chris Charles), Al Case (CE as Al Lush), Jerry Scott, Roy Frank, Jerry Walker (as Harry Birrell on KNX, CBS, LA), Ed Grilli, Gary Lewi, Bob Dunn, Ben Avery (AP), Bill Whitney (CBS Radio News NYC), Frank Settipani (CBS Radio News NYC), Dr. Bettina Gregory (ABC News), Carol Silva (WINS, News 12 Long Island), Drew Scott (News 12 Long Island), Larry Kofsky (Bloomberg Business Radio), Ed Zidner, Bill Stoller (ABC Radio News), Howard Liberman (WINS, Fox Business Network), Mitch Lebe (many including WRFM, WYNY, WCBS, WBBR all NYC), Wes Richards (WRFM, WOR, WBBR all NYC), Mike Sullivan, and Bob Allen (ND).

On July 22, 1981, Susquehanna sold WGBB to a group headed by Franz Allina for close to $1 million. The new operators had taken control by mid-September. Charlie Day had departed for WCBS-FM NYC just prior to this sale, and Program Director Gil David had taken over morning duties, followed by  'Gary T' middays and Bob Dayton pm drive time. (Dayton had been on-air at WABC from 1963 to 1965, but had lost his job after the legendary "Hiroshima" incident, later working in Los Angeles radio before returning east.) 7-midnight was hosted by Glenn Turnbull with Dick Farrell on overnights. Weekends were covered by the weekday staff except the Saturday - Sunday 6pm - Midnight shift which was hosted by Joseph M. 'Joe' Calisi. Juliet Papa and Debbie Wetzel were in the newsroom. Papa went on to WINS and Wetzel to WCBS-FM, where she anchored AM news reports for 17 years.

On November 19, 1986, Noble Broadcast Group acquired WGBB joining it with WBAB-FM a Babylon, NY based AOR outlet. WGBB would soon move to the new West Babylon WBAB studios on Sunrise Highway. On January 22, 1988, the sixty-four-year-old WGBB call letters were retired and 1240 took the identity of its FM sister station becoming WBAB and began simulcasting WBAB-FM most of the time.  Also in 1988 night-time power was increased to 1,000 watts from 250 watts as was the case for all class IV local channel stations in the U.S. on 1240 and other local frequencies including 1230, 1340, 1400, 1450, and 1490. When the simulcast with WBAB-FM ended 1240 began airing a news-talk format and on April 15, 1991, returned to the original WGBB call letters.

WGBB and WBAB were purchased by Liberty Broadcasting on February 15, 1993, for $16 million. The deal did not separate WGBB's value. Liberty later added WBLI in Patchogue, New York and WHFM in Southampton, New York to its Long Island station cluster. WBLI would keep its Top 40 format, while WHFM became a simulcast of WBAB.

On July 1, 1996 Robert F. X. Sillerman's SFX Broadcasting Inc. announced it had acquired Liberty Broadcasting. As part of the deal SFX and Chancellor Broadcasting (owners of WALK and WALK-FM in Patchogue, New York) also agreed to exchange SFX's four Long Island stations in New York, gained in the Liberty acquisition, for two of Chancellor's Jacksonville, Fla., stations and $11 million. On October 7, 1996, WGBB and WBAB-FM began an LMA with Chancellor Broadcasting, a simulcast with WALK AM 1370 was begun under the name "Sunrise Radio Network". On September 4, 1997, Chancellor changed its name to Chancellor Media Corp. The deal with Chancellor Media to purchase WGBB & WBAB-FM fell through in early 1998 after the Justice Department filed an antitrust suit to block Chancellor's purchase, and the simulcast ended. At that time WGBB began running the audio portion of CNN Headline News during the times no local talk shows were scheduled.

On May 22, 1998 Cox Broadcasting, a large national chain, purchased WGBB, WBAB-FM, WBLI and WHFM. Cox's main interest was in the FM stations and a few months later, in October 1998, dealt WGBB to a splinter group of Multicultural Broadcasting for $1.7 million. Under the new ownership, WGBB began broadcasting in Chinese by simulcasting the Chinese Radio Network in time slots not brokered to outside producers. After the sale of WGBB to Multicultural, WGBB moved from a bright, modern facility to a dingy, cramped studio at 1850 Lansdowne Avenue across Sunrise Highway from the Merrick Long Island Rail Road station; meanwhile, WBLI moved from their studios in Medford, New York into the studios that WGBB had just vacated. 

A few years later, another move took place, this time to the WNYG (another Multicultural outlet) facilities at 404 Route 109 near Sunrise Highway in Babylon, New York. WNYG was sold a few years later and relocated to Medford, which left WGBB alone in the old WNYG facility.

References

Further reading 
 Bill Jaker, Frank Sulek, Peter Kanze, The Airwaves of New York: Illustrated Histories of 156 AM Stations in the Metropolitan Area, 1921–1996, McFarland (July 7, 2008), p. 72-74.

External links 
 

 
 
 
 
 
 Chinese Radio Network heard on WGBB
 SPORTSTALK1240 heard on WGBB

GBB
Radio stations established in 1924
Mass media in Nassau County, New York
1924 establishments in New York (state)